The little cuckoo (Coccycua minuta) is a species of bird in the cuckoo family (Cuculidae) from South America and Panama. It was formerly placed in the genus Piaya, but was moved to the reinstated genus Coccycua following the discovery that its closest living relatives are a couple species traditionally placed in Coccyzus or Micrococcyx, rather than the other members of Piaya.

Description

The adult is mainly chestnut brown, with a greyish lower belly, browner tail and white tips to the tail feathers. The bill is yellow, short, and decurved; the iris of the eyes is red. Immature birds are dark brown with a black bill and no white tail tips. It is smaller and the throat is darker than in the squirrel cuckoo.

The little cuckoo makes harsh chek and kak calls.

Range, habitat and behavior
This small cuckoo occurs from Panama and Trinidad south through Colombia to Bolivia, Peru and Brazil; in Ecuador, it has been recorded as high up as  ASL. The little cuckoo is found in mangrove swamps, and scrubby woodland near water. It is generally believed to be an all-year resident, but its irregular occurrence in some areas has led to speculations that it undertakes seasonal short-distance migrations. Fairly widely distributed and not particularly rare, it is not considered a threatened species by the IUCN.

This is a shy species which tends to keep to cover as it forages in low branches for insects and other arthropods. The female lays two white eggs in a deep cup nest in a tree or bamboo. Like most American cuckoos, it incubates the eggs itself.

References

External links
Little Cuckoo videos on the Internet Bird Collection
Little Cuckoo photo gallery VIREO
Photo-High Res; Article pbase.com
Photo-High Res; Article geometer–"Best Bird Photos"

little cuckoo
little cuckoo
Birds of the Amazon Basin
Birds of the Guianas
Birds of Colombia
Birds of Venezuela
Birds of Ecuador
Birds of Trinidad and Tobago
Birds of Panama
little cuckoo
little cuckoo
Birds of Brazil